The 2000–01 Czech Cup was the eighth season of the annual football knock-out tournament of the Czech Republic. Winners Viktoria Žižkov qualified for the 2001–02 UEFA Cup.

Teams

Preliminary round
26 teams took part in the preliminary round.

|}

Round 1
83 teams entered the competition at this stage. Along with the 13 winners from the preliminary round, these teams played 48 matches to qualify for the second round.

|}

Round 2

|}

Round 3

|}

Round 4
The fourth round was played between 20 and 25 March 2001.

|}

Quarterfinals
The quarterfinals were played between 10 and 12 April 2001.

|}

Semifinals
The semifinals were played on 1 and 2 May 2001.

|}

Final
The final was played with the golden goal rule; in the event of a tie after 90 minutes, 30 minutes additional time would be added, with any goal signalling the immediate end of the game.

See also
 2000–01 Czech First League
 2000–01 Czech 2. Liga

References

External links
 Official site 
 Czech Republic Cup 2000/01 at RSSSF.com

2000–01
2000–01 domestic association football cups
Cup